is a passenger railway station in the city of Chōshi, Chiba Japan, operated by the East Japan Railway Company (JR East).

Lines
Shimōsa-Toyosato Station is served by the Narita Line, and is located 66.2 kilometers from the terminus of line at Sakura Station.

Station layout
The station consists of dual opposed side platforms connected by a footbridge to a wooden, single-story station building. The station is unattended.

Platforms

History
Shimōsa-Toyosato Station was opened on March 11, 1933 as a station on the Japanese Government Railway (JGR) for both freight and passenger operations. After World War II, the JGR became the Japan National Railways (JNR). Scheduled freight operations were suspended from October 1, 1971. The station has been unattended since March 1, 1985. The station was absorbed into the JR East network upon the privatization of the Japan National Railways (JNR) on April 1, 1987. The station building was rebuilt in 2008.

Passenger statistics
In fiscal 2006, the station was used by an average of 171 passengers daily.

Surrounding area
 
 Chōshi City Hall Toyosato Branch Office
 Chōshi Municipal No. 7 Junior High School
Toyosato Elementary School, Choshi City

See also
 List of railway stations in Japan

References

External links

JR East station information 

Railway stations in Japan opened in 1933
Railway stations in Chiba Prefecture
Narita Line
Chōshi